The Eleventh District A & M School–South Georgia College Historic District is a part of South Georgia State College in Douglas, Georgia.  Ten of its buildings are listed as contributing properties in a historic district listed on the National Register of Historic Places.

History
The Eleventh District A & M School was one of the original eleven regional high schools created by the Georgia General Assembly in 1906, in a system which became the Georgia State Agricultural and Mechanical School System. The school evolved into a junior college - one of the first state-supported junior colleges in the state.  It was named South Georgia State Junior College from 1927 to 1929, South Georgia State College from 1929 to 1936, South Georgia College from 1936 until sometime in the early 2010s, when it was named South Georgia State College again.

There are ten campus buildings built between 1907 and 1958 which are listed as contributing buildings.  Three are Peterson Hall (originally the Academic Building), and original dormitories Davis Hall and Powell Hall.  These all date from 1907 and were designed by the Atlanta architect Haralson Bleckley.

Contributing buildings
 Peterson Hall (1907)
 Davis Hall (1907)
 Powell Hall (1907)
 College Dining Hall (now IT-Nursing Building) (1927)
 Golf Shack (ca. 1927)
 Clower Gymnasium (1936)
 Thrash Hall (library, 1939)
 Alumni House (originally the president's house) (1953)
 Tanner Hall (1956)
 Stubbs Hall (1958)

References

School buildings completed in 1906
Coffee County, Georgia
Historic districts on the National Register of Historic Places in Georgia (U.S. state)
1906 establishments in Georgia (U.S. state)
National Register of Historic Places in Coffee County, Georgia